Namazi Square is one of the main squares in Shiraz, Iran. Namazi Hospital, Kharazmi Library, Motahari Clinic, Emam Reza Clinic and the engineering building of Shiraz University are located near this square.

Transportation

Routes
 Zand Boulevard
 Daneshjoo Boulevard
 Mollasadra Street

Buses
 Route 1
 Route 22
 Route 24
 Route 68
 Route 70
 Route 71
 Route 74
 Route 91
 Route 109
 Route 120
 Route 138
 Route 151
 Route 154

Metro
 Namazi Metro Station

Streets in Shiraz